The 1989 European Cup final was a football match held at the Camp Nou in Barcelona, Spain on 24 May 1989, that saw Milan of Italy defeat Steaua București of Romania 4–0. Two goals each from Marco van Basten and Ruud Gullit gave the Italian side their third victory in the competition.

Route to the final

Match

Details

See also
1988–89 European Cup
A.C. Milan in European football
FC Steaua București in European football

External links
1988–89 season at UEFA.com

1
European Cup Final 1989
European Cup Final 1989
1989
International club association football competitions hosted by Spain
Euro
Euro
May 1989 sports events in Europe
Football in Barcelona
1980s in Barcelona
Sports competitions in Barcelona
1989 in Catalan sport